Medical City may refer to:

Medical City Dallas Hospital
The Medical City, a Philippine hospital network
The Medical City Clark, in Mabalacat
The Medical City Ortigas, in Pasig
Guam Regional Medical City, in Dededo, Guam
Sheikh Khalifa Medical City, a hospital in Abu Dhabi, United Arab Emirates